La William was a Belgian professional cycling team that existed from 1989 to 1993. Its main sponsor was Belgian sauce company La William. The team was managed by Paul De Baeremaecker for the first two seasons, followed by Rudy Pevenage.

References

Cycling teams based in Belgium
Defunct cycling teams based in Belgium
1989 establishments in Belgium
1993 disestablishments in Belgium
Cycling teams established in 1989
Cycling teams disestablished in 1993